Nazih Abu Afach (Arabic: نزيه أبو عفش) (born 1946) is a Syrian poet and painter. He was born in western Syria, in the village of Marmarita 60 km from Homs. His first book of poetry came out in 1967, and since then he has published a dozen more collections. He works as an editor for the monthly magazine Al-Mada. His work has appeared in English translation in Banipal magazine.

Selected works
 Al-Wajhu Allathi Laa Yaghriibu (The Face Which Does Not Fade), Homs, 1967 
 ‘An Al-Khawfi Wa Al-Tamaathiili (On Fear and Statues), Damascus, 1970
 Hiwaariyat Al-Mawti Wa Al-Nakhiili (Talk of Death and the Palm Tree), Damascus, 1971 
 Wishaa’un Min Al-‘Ashbi Li-Umahaati Al-Qatlaa (Blades of Grass for the Mothers of the Killed), Beirut, 1975
 Ayahaa Al-Zamanu Al-Dayyiqu – Ayatuhaa Al-Ardu Al-Waasi’au (Oh Narrow Time, Oh Vast Earth), Damascus, 1978
 Allahu Qariibun Min Qalbi (God Is Near My Heart), Beirut, 1980
 Allaah Yabkii (God Cries), Al-Mada Publishing House, Damascus, 2001 
 ‘Ahal At-Taabuut (People of the Coffin), Al-Mada Publishing House, Damascus, 2001 
 Indjiil Al-‘A’maa (The Bible of the Blind), Dar Al-Adab, Beirut, 2003
 Al-Dhikrah Al-‘Anaaṣir (Memory of the Elements), Al-Mada Publishing House, Damascus, 2005
 Ar-Raa’ii Al-Hamadjii (The Barbaric Shepherd), 2011

References

Syrian poets